Yannick Hanfmann (born 13 November 1991) is a German professional tennis player. He has a career-high ATP singles ranking of world No. 92, first achieved in May 2021. He is known for his powerful serves (up to 143 mph) and groundstrokes.

Hanfmann played college tennis at the University of Southern California.

He is hearing-impaired, having been so since birth.

Professional career

2017: First career ATP final

Hanfmann made his ATP main draw debut at the 2017 BMW Open after defeating Arthur De Greef and Uladzimir Ignatik in the qualifying rounds. He, ranked world No. 273, then upset both Gerald Melzer and Thomaz Bellucci to reach the quarterfinals, where he lost to second-seed Roberto Bautista Agut.

At the 2017 Swiss Open Gstaad, Hanfmann made a sensational run to the final after defeating Facundo Bagnis, third seed and defending champion Feliciano López, eighth seed João Sousa and sixth seed Robin Haase, again as a qualifier. In his semifinal victory over Haase he saved four match points. He lost to Fabio Fognini in the final.

2018–2019: Grand Slam debut at US and French Open, top 100 
He reached the top 100 at World No. 99 on 16 July 2018 following his Challenger title in Braunschweig, Germany.

2020–2021: Second ATP final, Australian Open & Wimbledon & Miami debuts, top-10 win
Hanfmann reached his second career ATP Tour final at the 2020 Generali Open Kitzbühel in Austria, but lost that final in straight sets to Serbian Miomir Kecmanović.

He recorded his maiden top-10 win against Gaël Monfils in the first round at the 2020 Hamburg European Open in Germany.

He made his debut at a Masters 1000 level at the 2021 Miami Open where he defeated Steve Johnson (tennis).

2022: First Major win, ATP semifinal , out of top 100 
At the 2022 Australian Open he won his first match at a Grand Slam defeating wildcard Thanasi Kokkinakis.

He skipped the clay season in Europe and was unable to qualify for the French Open and Wimbledon and as a result his ranking dropped to No. 152 on 18 July 2022.

Following Wimbledon he reached the round of 16 at the 2022 Swiss Open Gstaad as a qualifier.
Next at the 2022 Generali Open Kitzbühel he reached his fourth ATP semifinal overall and second at this tournament defeating Dominic Thiem for one of his biggest wins in his career.

2023
At the 2023 Chile Open he reached his ninth quarterfinal on clay and of his career as a qualifier defeating two Spaniards, defending champion Pedro Martinez and Roberto Carballes Baena.

Singles performance timeline 

Current through the 2023 Chile Open.

ATP career finals

Singles: 2 (2 runners-up)

ATP Challenger and ITF Futures finals

Singles: 17 (11 titles, 6 runners-up)

Doubles: 5 (4 titles, 1 runner-up)

Record against top 10 players
Hanfmann's match record against players who have been ranked in the top 10. Only ATP Tour main draw matches are considered.

  Marcos Baghdatis 1–0
  Gaël Monfils 1–0
  Casper Ruud 1–0
  Dominic Thiem 1–0
  Roberto Bautista Agut 0–1
  Pablo Carreño Busta 0–1
  Fabio Fognini 0–1
  Karen Khachanov 0–1
  Andrey Rublev 0–1
  Alexander Zverev 0–1
  Rafael Nadal 0–2

* .

Wins over top 10 players
He has a  record against players who were, at the time the match was played, ranked in the top 10.

References

External links

1991 births
Living people
German male tennis players
Sportspeople from Karlsruhe
USC Trojans men's tennis players
Deaf tennis players
20th-century German people
21st-century German people